Krasnye Zori is a rural locality (a settlement) in Alexandrovskoye Rural Settlement, Bykovsky District, Volgograd Oblast, Russia. The population was 106 as of 2010. There are 2 streets.

Geography 
Krasnye Zori is located 15 km east of Bykovo (the district's administrative centre) by road. Razdolye is the nearest rural locality.

References 

Rural localities in Bykovsky District